Four eclipses occurred during 2017:
Solar eclipses
Solar eclipse of February 26, 2017; annular
Solar eclipse of August 21, 2017; total
Lunar eclipses
February 2017 lunar eclipse; penumbral
August 2017 lunar eclipse; umbral

See also
Mitsubishi Eclipse Cross, a vehicle